Cnestidium is a genus of flowering plants belonging to the family Connaraceae.

Its native range is Mexico to Tropical America.

Species:

Cnestidium bakerianum 
Cnestidium froesii 
Cnestidium guianense 
Cnestidium rufescens

References

Connaraceae
Oxalidales genera